Sings from the Heart is the 1962 country music studio album released by George Jones in June 1962. The album was his eleventh studio LP release, and was his last with Mercury, after switching to United Artists in late 1961. The album's theme was listing of songs about the heart, and contains his last #1 with Mercury Records from 1961, Tender Years.

The LP release was Jones' fourth studio release during the 1960s, and lists many of his last recordings with Mercury, after 5 years on the label.

Background
Sings from the Heart was compiled from recordings during one of his last Mercury Records sessions, and some other sessions. The LP would be Jones' last release during his contract years with Mercury. The album includes his last #1 hit with Mercury titled, "Tender Years," and all other songs were titled with 'heart' somewhere. It contains 10 exceptional ballads, and the album was one of many LP's released by George in 1962.

Recording and composition

Side One tracks
The first track introduced on Sings from the Heart was "Achin', Breakin' Heart," which was recorded on February 8, 1961, and released as a single on January 6, 1962, and written by Rick Hall. "Hearts in My Dreams" was written by Jones and Roger Miller (1 of many the two wrote together in the late 1950s), and recorded on April 23, 1957, and is the oldest track listed. "Candy Hearts" was a song written and recorded by Jones in April 1959, and later was released as the b-side to "Window Up Above" in June 1960. "Talk to Me Lonesome Heart" was written by James O'Gwynn, recorded in late August 1959, and was even included on his last LP release, Sings Country and Western Hits the previous year. The fifth track on the side was "With Half a Heart," which was written by Leon Payne and recorded in early April 1960. The last track of the side was "Heartaches by the Number," written by Harlan Howard, and recorded sometime in April 1960.

Side Two tracks
One of Jones' best Mercury recordings, however, largely unappreciated, was the opening track to side 2, "When My Heart Hurts No More," a more than exceptional ballad listing. The song was written by Jones' childhood friend and an often co-pen, Darrell Edwards, and famed cowboy ballad songwriter Helen Cross. It was recorded during the February 8, 1961 session, and was re-recorded with Musicor in 1967. "Cold, Cold Heart" was recorded for his 1960 album, Salute Hank Williams on April 21, 1960. "I've Got a New Heartache" was recorded sometime in 1957, written by Ray Price and Wayne Walker, and most recognizably, re-recorded as a duet with Gene Pitney. "I Gotta Talk to Your Heart" was another co-writing between Jones and Miller, and recorded on June 5, 1957. "Frozen Heart" was written by Jones and Jimmy Yancey, and recorded in October 1957. The last and most notable track listed was the "Tender Years," which later became a #1 after being released as a single on June 5, 1961. The song became one of Jones' greatest ballads, and its greatest version was a 1967 re-recording with Musicor.

Reception

The album was received well by critics, and even sold well. Tender Years later became the most well known song on the album. In 1984, Jones biographer Bob Allen wrote that "The manner in which he sang the words to 'Tender Years' (which, in mid-1961, became his second number one single) was, in fact, just about enough to make the short hairs stand up on the back of one's head."  In 1994, country music historian Colin Escott agreed, writing that the song "just about defined the territory he carved out as his own in the years ahead...the song, the production, and the performance came together in a statement of soon-to-be classic George Jones."

Track listing

External links
 George Jones' Official Website
 Record Label

1962 albums
George Jones albums
Albums produced by Shelby Singleton
Mercury Records albums